The 2014 IIHF U18 World Championship was the 16th IIHF World U18 Championship, and was hosted by Lappeenranta and Imatra, Finland. The tournament began on 17 April 2014, with the gold medal game played on 27 April 2014.

Top Division

Officials
The IIHF selected 12 referees and 10 linesmen to work the 2014 IIHF U18 World Championship.
They were the following:

Referees
  Andris Ansons
  Michael Hicks
  Pavel Hodek
  Mikko Kaukokari
  Daniel Konc
  Geoffrey Miller
  Kendrick Nicholson
  Linus Öhlund
  Anssi Salonen
  Gordon Schukies
  Alexander Sergeyev
  Tobias Wehrli

Linesmen
  Jordan Browne
  René Jensen
  Gleb Lazarev
  Miroslav Lhotský
  Andreas Malmqvist
  Dana Penkivech
  Jani Pesonen
  Nikolaj Ponomarjow
  Alexander Waldejer
  Sotaro Yamaguchi

Preliminary round

Group A

All times are local. (Eastern European Summer Time – UTC+03)

Group B

All times are local. (Eastern European Summer Time – UTC+03)

Relegation round 
The last-placed teams played a best-of-three series.

Denmark is relegated to next year's Division I A; the third game was not played because the result of the relegation series had been decided.

Knockout stage

Quarterfinals

Semifinals

Bronze medal game

Final

Scoring leaders
List shows the top ten skaters sorted by points, then goals.

GP = Games played; G = Goals; A = Assists; Pts = Points; +/− = Plus-minus; PIM = Penalties In MinutesSource: IIHF.com

Leading goaltenders
Only the top five goaltenders, based on save percentage, who have played 40% of their team's minutes are included in this list.
TOI = Time on ice (minutes:seconds); SA = Shots against; GA = Goals against; GAA = Goals against average; Sv% = Save percentage; SO = ShutoutsSource: IIHF.com

Tournament Awards
Best players selected by the directorate:
Best Goalkeeper: 
Best Defenseman: 
Best Forward: 
Source: IIHF.com

Final standings

Division I

Division I A
The Division I A tournament was played in Nice, France, from 13 to 19 April 2014.

Division I B
The Division I B tournament was played in Székesfehérvár, Hungary, from 13 to 19 April 2014.

Division II

Division II A
The Division II A tournament was played in Dumfries, Great Britain, from 24 to 30 March 2014.

Division II B
The Division II B tournament was played in Tallinn, Estonia, from 14 to 20 April 2014.

Division III

Division III A
The Division III A tournament was played in Sofia, Bulgaria, from 24 to 30 March 2014.

Division III B
The Division III B tournament was played in İzmit, Turkey, from 13 to 15 February 2014.

References

External links
Website

 
IIHF World U18 Championships
IIHF World U18 Championships
World
2014
Sport in Lappeenranta
Imatra
April 2014 sports events in Europe